Deerfield Township may refer to:
 Deerfield Township, Tioga County, Pennsylvania
 Deerfield Township, Warren County, Pennsylvania

Pennsylvania township disambiguation pages